Sorrell and Son is a British television miniseries which aired on ITV in six, hour-long episodes from 6 to 11 July 1984. The story is taken from the 1925 novel of the same name by Warwick Deeping. The story was previously filmed as a silent film in 1927 and again in 1934.

The television miniseries was produced by Yorkshire Television and it starred Richard Pasco and John Shrapnel

Plot summary
In post-World War I England, impoverished Captain Stephen Sorrell, M.C. (Richard Pasco) must raise his son Kit (Paul Critchley) by himself, after his wife walks out on him. Captain Sorrell's years of devotion and sacrifice for his son come to fruition years in the future.

Cast

 Richard Pasco as Stephen Sorrell, M.C. (6 episodes)  
 John Shrapnel as Thomas Roland (6 episodes)  
 Gwen Watford as Dora Sorrell (4 episodes) 
 Peter Chelsom as Kit Sorrell (4 episodes)  
 Prunella Ransome as Fanny Garland (4 episodes)  
 Sarah Neville as Molly Pentreath (3 episodes)  
 Michael Troughton as Maurice (3 episodes)  
 Elizabeth Sinclair Cherry (3 episodes)  
 Eve Pearce as Mrs. Marks (2 episodes)  
 Stephanie Tague as  Kate (2 episodes) 
 Stephanie Beacham as  Florence Palfrey (1 episode)  
 Malcolm Terris as  John Palfrey (1 episode)  
 Edward Peel as  Buck (1 episode)  
 Simon Shepherd as  Duncan Scott (1 episode)    
 Andrew Bicknell as  Blane (1 episode)
 Norman Wooland as  Dr. Wheelan (1 episode)
 Ron Pember as  Maggs (1 episode)
 Mark Eden as Oscar Wolffe (1 episode) 
 Christopher Bramwell as Phelps (1 episode)  
 John Horsley as Porteous (1 episode)  
 Peter Ivatts as  Billiard player (1 episode)  
 Noel Johnson as Colonel (1 episode)  
 Barbara Kinghorn as  American (1 episode)  
 Miranda Richardson as  Lola (1 episode) 
 Dorothy Vernon as  Lady Pentreath (1 episode)

Reception
Writing for The Los Angeles Times, Terry Atkinson called the series "a tolerable drama about some very likable people", but with a caveat: "These people are too likable--unrealistically caring, kind and resigned. Or, in rare cases when someone less than a saint shows up, he or she flaunts the transparently despicable characteristics of a Snidely Whiplash. Everyone's either a dear old soul or a scoundrel." He summarized it as "mildly engrossing fare."

References

Bibliography
 Jerry Roberts. Encyclopedia of Television Film Directors. Scarecrow Press, 2009.

External links
 

1984 British television series debuts
1984 British television series endings
1980s British drama television series
ITV television dramas
1980s British television miniseries
Television shows based on British novels
Television series by ITV Studios
Television series by Yorkshire Television
English-language television shows
Television shows set in England